John Vander Woude is an American politician serving as a member of the Idaho House of Representatives from the 22A district. He has also served as House majority caucus leader since 2013. He previously represented the 21A district in the House from 2006 to 2008.

Early life 
Vander Woude was born in Paramount, California. He graduated high school and served in the United States Army from 1968 until 1970.

Career 
Vander Woude worked as a dairy farmer until he retired. He was a member of the Nampa Christian School Board for 16 years and also served on the boards of the United Dairymen of Idaho, Milk Producers of Idaho, and Idaho Dairy Herd Improvement Association.

He was first elected to the Idaho House of Representatives in 2006 and served until he was defeated by Rich Jarvis by 65 votes in 2008. He was re-elected to his old seat in 2010. Vander Woude's district was adjusted after the 2010 United States census, and he has won re-election in 2012, 2014, 2016, 2018, and 2020.

Personal life 
Vander Woude's daughter, Lori Den Hartog, is a member of the Idaho Senate. This marked the first time a father and daughter have served together in the Idaho legislature.

References

External links
John Vander Woude at the Idaho Legislature

Year of birth missing (living people)
Living people
Republican Party members of the Idaho House of Representatives
People from Paramount, California
People from Nampa, Idaho
United States Army soldiers
21st-century American politicians